Lee Keung Choi (also known as Ken Choi, born 19 November 1961) is a Hong Kong windsurfer. He competed in the Windglider event at the 1984 Summer Olympics.

References

External links
 
 

1961 births
Living people
Hong Kong windsurfers
Hong Kong male sailors (sport)
Olympic sailors of Hong Kong
Sailors at the 1984 Summer Olympics – Windglider
Asian Games bronze medalists for Hong Kong
Asian Games medalists in sailing
Sailors at the 1982 Asian Games
Medalists at the 1982 Asian Games
Place of birth missing (living people)
20th-century Hong Kong people